United Cities and Local Governments Middle East and West Asia Section (UCLG-MEWA) is one of nine regional sections of United Cities and Local Governments, with headquarters in Istanbul.

The International Union of Local Authorities, Section for the Eastern Mediterranean and Middle East Region (IULA-EMME) was the predecessor of UCLG-MEWA. It was established in Turkey in 1987 as one of the regional sections of International Union of Local Authorities (IULA). IULA-EMME changed into UCLG-MEWA in 2004, in parallel with the creation and restructuring of the UCLG World Organization.

Since its establishment, UCLG-MEWA continues its activities for cities and local governments from its Istanbul headquarters, serving its principles of democracy, human rights, local self-government, international solidarity, accountability and transparency, and sustainable development.

Activities include:
 Participating in the governing organs and the working groups of the UCLG World Organization
 Supporting global programs and campaigns conducted or supported by the UCLG World Organization (such as GOLD, Alliance of Civilizations, Millennium Development Goals and Climate Change)
 Contributing to local government-related components of global meetings involving the active presence of the UCLG World Organization (such as the World Water Forum and Alliance of Civilizations Forum)
 Serving its members through activities including cooperation and collaboration, exchange of experience and ideas, training and capacity building programs, information and documentation, and project development
 Involving and partnering with its members and supporting the localization process of sustainable development with City Councils after Turkey Local Agenda 21 Program.
 Preparing publications and documents concerning local authorities, and supporting the preparation of such publications by its members.

References

External links 

 
 UCLG-MEWA Presentation
 UCLG-MEWA Newsletter
 www.uclg.org

Organizations based in Istanbul
UCLG Sections
International organizations based in Turkey